Daniel Plaza Montero (born 3 July 1966) is a Spanish former race walker who competed in the 20 km event at the 1988, 1992 and 1996 Olympics. He won a gold medal in 1992 in his native Barcelona, becoming the first Spanish track & field athlete ever to win an Olympic gold medal.

Overturned drugs ban 

In 2006 Plaza was cleared of a Nandrolone related drug ban by Spain's Supreme Court

References 

1966 births
Athletes (track and field) at the 1988 Summer Olympics
Athletes (track and field) at the 1992 Summer Olympics
Athletes (track and field) at the 1996 Summer Olympics
Living people
Spanish male racewalkers
Athletes from Catalonia
Olympic athletes of Spain
Olympic gold medalists for Spain
Athletes from Barcelona
European Athletics Championships medalists
Olympic gold medalists in athletics (track and field)
Mediterranean Games bronze medalists for Spain
Mediterranean Games medalists in athletics
Athletes (track and field) at the 1987 Mediterranean Games
Medalists at the 1992 Summer Olympics